Talbotia may refer to:
 Talbotia (plant), a monotypic genus of monocotyledonous flowering plants
 Pieris (butterfly) or Talbotia, a genus of butterflies